Laurier Bridge may refer to:
 Laurier Avenue Bridge in Ottawa
 Laurier Railway Bridge in Montreal

See also 
 Laurier (disambiguation)